CSPE can refer to:

 Centre for the Study of Perceptual Experience at the University of Glasgow
California Society of Professional Engineers
 Civic, Social and Political Education, a compulsory subject in all secondary schools in the Republic of Ireland that focuses mainly on citizenship along with human rights, stewardship and interdependence.
 Chlorosulfonated polyethylene